Mohamed Tetteh Nortey (born 20 November 1990 in Accra) is a Ghanaian football (soccer) player currently playing at the position of defender for Techiman Eleven Wonders FC.

Career
Nortey began his career with Düsseldorf FC Accra, before joined in 2007 to African United and signed than on 11 April 2008 for Accra Hearts of Oak SC.

International career 
The left back played for the Black Starlets in 2007 FIFA U-17 World Cup in Korea Republic.

References

Living people
Ghanaian footballers
Footballers from Accra
1988 births
Accra Hearts of Oak S.C. players
Association football midfielders
Techiman Eleven Wonders FC players